The Autobots is a 2015 Chinese computer animated motorsports comedy film directed by Zhuo Jianrong. It was released on July 4, 2015. The film was heavily criticized for its plot, overall animation quality, characters and, most importantly, being a direct plagiary, knock-off and rip-off  of Pixar’s 2011 film Cars 2.

Production
The production company and filmmaker stated that it was an independently produced film, while several critics and people who watched the film accused it of being copied from Disney and Pixar's Cars franchise (with the characters looking like the characters from Cars). Shen Lu, Katie Hunt, and Anna Hsieh of CNN stated that the Chinese title of the film was similar to the Mainland Chinese title of Cars.

Copyright infringement lawsuit
In July 2016, The Walt Disney Company filed a copyright case through the Shanghai Pudong New Area People's Court and on December 29, 2016 the court ruled in favor of Disney, fining Bluemtv and G-Point $190,000 and ordering them to cease copyright infringement.

Cancelled sequel
A sequel for the film, The Autobots 2 was scheduled for release in Summer 2017. However, the sequel was ultimately canceled due to The Walt Disney Company winning a copyright case. The latest information about the sequel announcement is from 2016.

References

External links
 

2015 animated films
2015 films
2015 computer-animated films
Chinese animated films
Chinese auto racing films
Animated films about auto racing
Animated films about automobiles
Film controversies
Films involved in plagiarism controversies
Cars (franchise)
2010s American films